Dunmore is a borough in Lackawanna County, Pennsylvania, United States, adjoining Scranton. It is part of Northeastern Pennsylvania and was settled in 1835 and incorporated in 1862. Extensive anthracite coal, brick, stone, and silk interests had led to a rapid increase in the population from 8,315 in 1890 to 23,086 in 1940. The population was 14,042 in the 2020 census.

History 
Dunmore was settled in 1835, and incorporated in 1862.

The first white person to set foot on Dunmore soil was Count Zinzendorf of Saxony, in 1742, as a missionary to the native people who were Munsee-speaking Delawares.

The territory now encompassing Dunmore was purchased from the natives in 1754 by the Susquehanna Company of Connecticut and became the township of Providence. The first settlers of the Dunmore area arrived in 1771 and were originally from Connecticut (see Pennamite–Yankee War). William Allsworth established an inn here in 1783. In the summer of 1795, Charles Dolph, John Carey, and John West began the labor of clearing and plowing lands in the neighborhood of "Bucktown" or "Corners", as this area was called. Edward Lunnon, Isaac Dolph, James Brown, Philip Swartz and Levi De Puy, purchased land here between 1799–1805.

Stephen Tripp, in 1820, began the area's first business, erecting a saw and grist mill on the Roaring Brook half a mile south of the village. That same year, the Drinker Turnpike Company opened a store at the Corners. Shortly after Joseph Tanner opened the first blacksmith shop. C.W. Potter opened the first merchandising house in the village in 1845.

The village, consisting of but four houses, had a negative existence until the Pennsylvania Coal Company, in 1847–1848, turned it into a growing and diverse town.

By 1875, the township of Providence was dissolved and the land split up into various smaller boroughs and towns with Dunmore being one of them. Today, Dunmore is a borough bordering the city of Scranton.

The name Dunmore comes from Dunmore Park, in the Falkirk area of Scotland (home of the Dunmore Pineapple).

Golo Footwear had its original manufacturing and design facilities in Dunmore until 1957.

Geography
Dunmore is located at  (41.417530, −75.624432).

Roaring Brook flows from the southeast and turns west through the Nay Aug Gorge in Dunmore to the Lackawanna River in Scranton. Most of the borough is drained by Roaring Brook, except for an area in the west drained by Meadow Brook into the Lackawanna River. The southeastern side of the borough is on the slopes of the Moosic Mountains, which the gorge cuts through.

The Lackawanna Railroad operated through the Nay Aug Gorge into Scranton from the Poconos and Northern New Jersey.

Demographics

As of the 2010 United States Census, there were 14,057 people, 5,999 households, and 3,388 families residing in the borough. The population density was 1,579.4 people per square mile (610/km²). There were 6,530 housing units at an average density of 733.7 per square mile (286.6/km²). The racial makeup of the borough was 95.2% White, 1.1% African American, 0.05% Native American, 1.8% Asian, 0.05% Pacific Islander, 0.8% from other races, and 1% from two or more races. Hispanic or Latino of any race were 2.3% of the population.

There were 5,999 households, out of which 22% had children under the age of 18 living with them, 40.6% were married couples living together, 11.5% had a female householder with no husband present, and 43.5% were non-families. 37.9% of all households were made up of individuals, and 16% had someone living alone who was 65 years of age or older. The average household size was 2.18 and the average family size was 2.93.

The ages of the population were 17.9% under the age of 18, 62.1% from 18 to 64, and 20% 65 years or older. The median age was 42.1 years.

The median income for a household in the borough was $33,280, and the median income for a family was $43,354. Males had a median income of $32,855 versus $24,167 for females. The per capita income for the borough was $19,851. About 6.7% of families and 10.5% of the population were below the poverty line, including 11.1% of those under age 18 and 11.8% of those age 65 or over.

Economy
Gertrude Hawk Chocolates, founded in 1936, is based in Dunmore.

The Keystone Industrial Park is also located in Dunmore.

Environmental issues
Keystone Sanitary Landfill, the largest landfill in the state of Pennsylvania has been located in Dunmore since 1973, about 450 feet from the Dunmore Reservoir #1, a backup drinking water supply. In 1987, it extended to Throop, Pennsylvania. The landfill was built over mines known for ground subsidence. As of 2015 the landfill accepts over 7,200 tons of trash per day. More than a third of its in-state waste since 2009 is from fracking drill cuttings, drilling mud and fluids. Cuttings are mixed with small amounts of naturally occurring radioactive elements, particularly radium-226. The landfill has been leaking into ground water per its Phase 3 permit application. Run-off is discharged into Eddy's Creek and the Lackawanna River.

In November 2014, the Dunmore borough council approved a $15.63 million agreement for Keystone as a basis for an extension, and a definition of the landfill as a “pre-existing landfill” to ensure Keystone a more favorable interpretation of the borough's zoning ordinance against public opinion.

On September 20, 2018, Pennsylvania DEP issued a Notice of Violation to Keystone for storing leachate in excess of 25% of its total leachate storage capacity on a regular basis since October 2016.

Infrastructure

Education

Public schools
Dunmore has one public school district with three sections that are based on age: Dunmore Elementary Center, Dunmore Middle School and Dunmore High School. The principal of the Elementary Center is Matthew Quinn, the principal of the High School is Timothy Hopkins, and the Superintendent of Schools is John Marichak.

Parochial schools
Dunmore has two Roman Catholic schools, under the administration of the Diocese of Scranton: Saint Mary's of Mount Carmel Elementary School (PK-8), led by principal Cathy Sosnowski, and Holy Cross High School. The current principal of Holy Cross High School is Benjamin Tolerico, their vice-principal is Cathy Chiumento and their Dean of Students is Kandy Taylor. They also have a school chaplain, Rev. Cyril Edwards.

Post-secondary schools
Marywood University is located in Dunmore.

Penn State Scranton is located in Dunmore.

Transportation
The western terminus of Interstate 84 is in Dunmore. I-84/I-380 follows the Nay Aug Gorge westward towards the spaghetti junction interchange with Interstate 81 and U.S. Route 6. I-81 also has an interchange with 347 in Dunmore.

Notable people
 Mehmood Ali (1932–2004), actor, "India's Comedy King", died in Dunmore
 Sister Mary Adrian Barrett, I.H.M. (1929–2015), Catholic social worker and educator
 Christopher F. Burne, U.S. Air Force brigadier general
 Clare Horan Cawley (1874–1921), pianist
 Nestor Chylak (1922–1982), Major League Baseball umpire
 Vic Delmore (1917–1960), Major League Baseball umpire
 Carol Ann Drazba (1943–1966), first American nurse to die in the Vietnam War
 Vic Fangio, head coach of the Denver Broncos in the National Football League
 Eugene A. Garvey (1845–1920), bishop of Altoona
 Joseph Kopacz (born 1950), Bishop of Jackson, Mississippi
Ruth Earnshaw Lo (1910-2006), professor and writer, based in China 1937 to 1977
 Jeanne Marrazzo, microbiologist, director of the University of Alabama School of Medicine Division of Infectious Diseases
 Joe Mooney, Major League Baseball groundskeeper for more than three decades; Boston Red Sox Hall of Fame member
 John Willard Raught (1857–1931), landscape artist
 Paul W. Richards, astronaut who flew on Mission STS-102 on board the Space Shuttle Discovery
 John Francis Ropek (1917–2009), oceanographer for the first under-ice polar expedition of 
 Tim Ruddy, center for NFL's Miami Dolphins from 1994–2003; for most of career was center of Pro Football Hall of Fame quarterback Dan Marino
 Beverly Tyler (1927-2005), actress and singer
 Junior Walsh (1919–1990), professional baseball player for Pittsburgh Pirates
 Jerry Wemple (born 1960), poet

Gallery

See also
Jefferson Center Dunmore

References

Taken from Susan W. Pieroth's compilation

External links
 
 

Populated places established in 1783
Boroughs in Lackawanna County, Pennsylvania
1783 establishments in Pennsylvania